Highway 32 (AR 32, Ark. 32, and Hwy. 32) is a designation for three state highways in South Arkansas. One route of  runs from Oklahoma State Highway 3 (SH-3) at the Oklahoma state line east to Highway 355 at Saratoga. A second route of  begins near Hope Municipal Airport and runs through Oakhaven to Highway 29. A third segment of  begins at US 278 and runs east to US 371 in Willisville.



Route description
AR 32 runs east from Oklahoma and meets AR 41 in Foreman. After angling south, AR 32 meets US 59/US 71 in Ashdown and AR 355 in Saratoga. The route then winds through the country before meeting US 278 near the Hope Municipal Airport. Continuing east, AR 32 crosses Interstate 30 and runs with US 278 BUS until exiting town headed southeast. The route meets AR 53 in Bodclaw and US 371/AR 19 in Willisville, where the route terminates.

Major intersections
Mile markers reset at concurrencies.

Ashdown business route

Major intersections

|-
| align=center colspan=4 |  concurrency south, 
|-

See also

References

External links

032
Transportation in Little River County, Arkansas
Transportation in Hempstead County, Arkansas
Transportation in Nevada County, Arkansas